Peter Walker Latham (1865–1953) was a British racquets and real tennis player.

Latham held the Rackets World Championships title from 1887 to 1902.  He was also the world champion of real tennis from 1895 to 1905, and again from 1907 to 1908.

See also
 Real tennis world champions
 Rackets World Championships

References

English racquets players
English real tennis players
1865 births
1953 deaths
World rackets champion